The Nambiar (also written as Nambyar) is a Hindu Ambalavasi caste of Kerala.  
Ambalavasi Nambiars wear sacred thread like Brahmins and is traditionally considered as a higher caste to Nairs including same name bearing Nair-Nambiar caste which usually leads to confusion.

See also
Kunchan Nambiar
Mizhavu
Ottan Thullal
Chakyar koothu

References

 

Social groups of India
Indian castes
Kerala society
Malayali Brahmins
Hindu communities